Kate Friedlander (born Käte Frankl; also Käte Misch-Frankl or Kate Friedländer-Frankl; 1902–1949) was a pioneering female psychoanalyst, who left Germany for England in 1933, and became a member of the British Psychoanalytical Society.

Training and contributions
Analysed by Hanns Sachs, Friedlander placed herself squarely in the tradition of psychoanalysis represented by Anna Freud, and encouraged her in establishing the Hampstead Clinic for child therapy, as well as working herself in parallel outreach institutions.

Among her theoretical contributions were an exploration of libidinal elements in the wish to die - the Death drive - and an examination of female masochism through the figure of Charlotte Brontë.
She also wrote on the link between crime, and defects in the development of ego/superego.

Family
She was the mother of philosopher Sybil Wolfram (born Sybille Misch). The scientist and entrepreneur Stephen Wolfram and technologist Conrad Wolfram are her grandchildren.

Selected writings
___'On the Longing to Die', International Journal of Psycho-Analysis XXI (1940)
___'Children's Books and their Function in Latency and Puberty' American Imago III (1942)
___The Psycho-Analytic Approach to Juvenile Delinquency (1947)

See also

Annie Reich
August Aichhorn
Controversial discussions
Oceanic feeling
Otto Fenichel
Paula Heimann
Wilhelm Reich

References

External links
"Kate Friedländer" at Psychoanalytikerinnen.de

1902 births
1949 deaths
British psychoanalysts
Freudian psychology
Analysands of Hanns Sachs
German emigrants to the United Kingdom